Marilène Gill  is a Canadian politician, who was elected to the House of Commons of Canada in the 2015 election. She represents the electoral district of Manicouagan as a member of the Bloc Québécois.

Gill was one of three Bloc MPs who supported Martine Ouellet's leadership during a caucus revolt and remained with the Bloc caucus when seven MPs resigned on February 28, 2018 to sit as Independents.

Gill is married to fellow Bloc MP Xavier Barsalou-Duval.

Electoral record

References

External links

Living people
Members of the House of Commons of Canada from Quebec
Bloc Québécois MPs
Women members of the House of Commons of Canada
People from Sorel-Tracy
1977 births
Women in Quebec politics
Canadian trade unionists
Canadian educators
21st-century Canadian politicians
21st-century Canadian women politicians
People from Côte-Nord